Mosna is an Italian surname. Notable people with the surname include:
 Diego Mosna (born 1948), Italian entrepreneur
 Gabriel Mosna (1992–2016), Brazilian vocalist of Brazilian Death Metal Band Neurotóxico
 Miguel Mosna (born 1962), Argentine boxer

Italian-language surnames
Surnames of South Tyrolean origin